Grimm's World is a 1969 science fiction novel by Vernor Vinge.

Background 
In 1968, Damon Knight published Vinge's novella "Grimm's Story" as part of Orbit 4. Knight told Vinge that if he expanded the novella to book-length, then he would get Vinge a contract with Berkley Books, where Knight worked as a science fiction editor. Vinge wrote an extension, and it became his first published novel. In 1987, Vinge revised the novel for Baen Books and added a new opening section, changing the title to Tatja Grimm's World.

Publication

References

External links 
Grimm's World at Fantastic Fiction

1969 American novels
1969 science fiction novels
American science fiction novels
Novels by Vernor Vinge
Berkley Books books
1969 debut novels